Wymondham Rough is a  biological Site of Special Scientific Interest (SSSI) east of Stapleford in Leicestershire. The SSSI is part of the 12.5 hectare Wymondham Rough nature reserve, which is managed by the Leicestershire and Rutland Wildlife Trust.

This clay grassland has a rich flora, dominated by common bent, Yorkshire fog, false oat-grass and cock's foot. A poorly drained area has plants such as water avens, and there are drier soils in the west of the site.

There is access from a gate north of the level crossing.

References

Leicestershire and Rutland Wildlife Trust
Sites of Special Scientific Interest in Leicestershire